Ângelo Domingos Salvador O.F.M. Cap. (17 July 1932 – 13 August 2022) was a Brazilian Roman Catholic prelate.

Salvador was born in Brazil and was ordained to the priesthood in 1958. He served as the titular bishop of Selia and as auxiliary bishop of the Roman Catholic Archdiocese of São Salvador da Bahia from 1981 to 1986. Salvador served as the bishop of the Roman Catholic Diocese of Coxim from 1986 to 1991, then served as bishop of the Roman Catholic Diocese of Cachoeira do Sul from 1991 to 1999 and then served as bishop of the Roman Catholic Diocese of Uruguaiana from 1999 until his retirement in 2007.

References

1932 births
2022 deaths
Brazilian Roman Catholic bishops
Bishops appointed by Pope John Paul II
Federal University of Rio de Janeiro alumni
People from Mato Grosso do Sul
People from Rio Grande do Sul
People from Vacaria
Capuchin bishops